Promontogno is a town in Graubünden, Switzerland.

Bregaglia
Villages in Switzerland